The FAW-GM Kuncheng is a compact pickup truck that is developed as a joint venture between General Motors and First Automobile Works. The pickup is currently sold only in mainland China, the base price is RMB¥60,500(US$9,722.62) and the luxury model is RMB¥66,500(US$10,686.85)

External links
fawgm.com
media.gm.com
faw-gm-kuncheng-pickup-truck

Pickup trucks